The 2019 Red Bull Cliff Diving World Series was the 11th season of the Red Bull-sponsored international cliff diving series. The series began on 13 April in El Nido, Philippines, with the final event taking place on 14 September in Bilbao, Spain.

Calendar

The 2019 calendar included three locations that were new to the series: El Nido, Dublin and Beirut. The final event took place on 14 September in Bilbao.

Divers

The line-up of divers for the 2019 series was announced in November 2018. The men's series featured 10 permanent divers, with former Olympic divers Constantin Popovici and Oleksiy Pryhorov joining the permanent line-up for the first time. In the women's series, the line-up of six permanent divers included 23-year-old newcomer Eleanor Smart, who was the youngest permanent diver on the 2019 tour. In addition to the permanent divers, at least four wildcard divers were selected to compete at each stop of the men's and women's series.

Permanent divers for the 2019 series:

Men
  Blake Aldridge
  David Colturi
  Gary Hunt
  Andy Jones
  Kris Kolanus
  Steven LoBue
  Michal Navrátil
  Jonathan Paredes
  Constantin Popovici
  Oleksiy Pryhorov

Women
  Rhiannan Iffland
  Adriana Jiménez
  Jessica Macaulay
  Yana Nestsiarava
  Lysanne Richard
  Eleanor Smart

Standings

At each event, each competing diver performed four dives. The diver with the highest cumulative score after all four dives was declared the winner, and was awarded 200 points. Further points were awarded to all divers who competed at each event, based on their finishing position.

Men

The men's series featured seven events. The 10 permanent divers were joined at each event by at least four wildcard divers.

Key

Women

The women's series featured seven events. The six permanent divers were joined at each event by at least four wildcard divers.

Key

References

External links

Official website

Red Bull Cliff Diving World Series
Red Bull Cliff Diving World Series
Red Bull Cliff Diving World Series
Red Bull Cliff Diving World Series
Red Bull Cliff Diving World Series
Red Bull Cliff Diving World Series
Red Bull Cliff Diving World Series
Red Bull Cliff Diving World Series
Red Bull Cliff Diving World Series
Red Bull Cliff Diving World Series
Red Bull Cliff Diving World Series
Red Bull Cliff Diving World Series
Red Bull Cliff Diving World Series
Red Bull Cliff Diving World Series
Red Bull Cliff Diving World Series